The 1998 World Weightlifting Championships were held in Lahti, Finland from November 7 to November 15. The men's competition in the lightweight (69 kg) division was staged on 12 November 1998.

Medalists

Records

Results

New records

References

External links
Results

1998 World Weightlifting Championships